The girls' ski cross event in freestyle skiing at the 2012 Winter Youth Olympics in Innsbruck, Austria, was held on 19 January at Kühtai. 12 athletes from 12 different countries took part in this event.The final was canceled due to weather conditions. The final result was adopted based on the results of the qualification.

Results

Qualification
The qualification was held on 19 January at 14:00.

References 

Freestyle skiing at the 2012 Winter Youth Olympics